Hans Gerhard Ramler (13 July 1928 – 11 December 2021) was a German politician. A member of the Social Democratic Party of Germany, he served in the Landtag of Schleswig-Holstein from 1971 to 1987. He died on 11 December 2021, at the age of 93.

References

1928 births
2021 deaths
Social Democratic Party of Germany politicians
Members of the Landtag of Schleswig-Holstein
20th-century German politicians
Politicians from Kiel